The NorthPort Batang Pier is a Philippine Basketball Association (PBA) team that first played in the 2012–13 PBA season. The team took over the franchise of the Powerade Tigers in 2012 after it was sold to Sultan 900 Capital, Inc. Besides NorthPort, team owner Mikee Romero also co-owned the AirAsia Philippine Patriots of the ASEAN Basketball League.

History

Harbour Centre Batang Pier

The origins of the NorthPort Batang Pier can be traced to the 2004 Philippine Basketball League (PBL) franchise, the Harbour Centre Port Masters owned by Mikee Romero. In 2007, they changed its team name to Harbour Centre Batang Pier until 2009. The franchise have successfully won 7 straight PBL championships under coach Glenn Capacio from the 2005–06 up to the 2008–09 season, which they carry the team name Oracle Residences Titans on the season's last conference. They also earned the first place in 2007 SEABA Champions Cup.

Sale of the Powerade franchise

On July 30, 2012, Coca-Cola Bottlers Philippines, Inc. announced that their PBA team, the Powerade Tigers, was sold to Sultan 900, Inc. which is owned and represented by its chairman and CEO Michael Romero. The Board of Governors unanimously approved the purchase on a special board meeting on August 17.

2012–2013 season

Philippine Cup

GlobalPort entered the league under the guidance of rookie head coach, Glenn Capacio, with the lineup led by Powerade carry-overs Gary David, Rabeh Al-Hussaini, Rudy Lingganay, Rey Guevarra, Jondan Salvador, Josh Vanlandingham, Will Antonio, Alex Crisano and Rommel Adducul, together with off-season trade in from Barangay Ginebra, Willie Miller (in exchange for JVee Casio), draft picks Vic Manuel, Jason Deutchman and AJ Mandani, and signed free agents Marvin Cruz, Mark Yee and Angelus Raymundo. The team finished with a disappointing 1–13 record in its maiden campaign, winning only on October 17, 2012 against Meralco.

Commissioner's Cup
Former Barako Bull coach Junel Baculi was appointed as the new head coach, while Capacio stayed on the GlobalPort coaching staff as Baculi's lead assistant. The team pulled off a major roster revamp, as the PBA approved two trades that landed previous conference's cellar dweller a major boost in the form of Sol Mercado and Japeth Aguilar, thus, forming the team's so-called MMDA (Miller, Mercado, David and Aguilar). The team acquired Mercado from the Meralco along with Kelly Nabong, Jaypee Belencion and Yousif Aljamal, in exchange for Rey Guevarra, Vic Manuel, Josh Vanlandingham and their 2015 1st-round pick, while Rabeh Al-Hussaini was traded out to Talk 'N Text for Aguilar. The new Batang Pier looked promising after winning 2 of its first 3 games, but then the team lost all of its remaining games in the elimination, ending its campaign with a 2–12 record.

Governors' Cup
On June 11, 2013, GlobalPort's MMDA was disbanded as Japeth Aguilar was traded to Barangay Ginebra for Yousef Taha and the 2013 1st round draft pick it received from Talk 'N Text. In a separate deal, the team acquired Jay Washington from Petron Blaze for Jason Deutchman and the Batang Pier's 2016 and 2017 second round draft picks. The team ended the eliminations with a 4–5 record as Washington exploded for a career-high of 30 points and led the team in a win on their final elimination assignment against Ginebra. After two consecutive conferences finishing at the bottom of the standings, the team finally lands a spot in the play-offs as they finished fifth in the eliminations. Facing fourth seeded Rain or Shine having a twice-to-beat advantage, and as Baculi got ejected for a second technical foul late in the third quarter, the Batang Pier lost by a single basket and got eliminated in the first game of their quarterfinals series.

2013–2014 season

Philippine Cup
Before the start of the next season, GlobalPort underwent another major overhaul. They let coach Baculi go and appointed Richie Ticzon as new coach in an interim capacity.  They've also traded away David to Meralco. He was packaged by the Batang Pier with rookie guard AJ Mandani and sent to Meralco for guard Chris Ross, Chris Timberlake and two future second-round draft picks. Ross was also traded away to Petron for Dennis Miranda, who was eventually traded to Barako Bull in exchange for the sixth overall draft pick which they used to select RR Garcia.  They also traded Miller to the Energy in exchange for veteran Enrico Villanueva on draft day.

To infuse some young blood to the team, they drafted college standouts Terrence Romeo (in the expense of sending Yousef Taha to Petron), Garcia, Isaac Holstein, Nico Salva and LA Revilla, who are tasked to team up with established veterans Sol Mercado, Jay Washington, and former league MVP Eric Menk, who returned from playing in the ABL. Holstein was later traded to San Mig Super Coffee in exchange for fellow rookie Justin Chua and veteran Leo Najorda. The team also acquired Jewel Ponferada from the Mixers for a future draft pick and signed up Marvin Hayes. They have even won their first ever winning streak since they joined the league. However, things go down the drain as they lost five straight games, only to be snapped in a win against Alaska, to keep their playoff hopes alive.

They ended their Philippine Cup elimination campaign with 5–9 win–loss record, taking the seventh place playoff spot, and were pitted against twice-to-beat Rain or Shine in the quarterfinal round.  They were ousted by E-Painters in their lone playoff game.

Commissioner's Cup

Prior to the start of the next conference, they have made significant changes again. Pido Jarencio takes over as the new coach, in his first pro coaching career, Richie Ticzon.  They have also traded away Mercado for Alex Cabagnot.  They sent Najorda back to Barako Bull for point guard Jonas Villanueva, with Villanueva then getting conveyed to Air21 for guard Bonbon Custodio. Menk was also appointed as the new captain of the team. Mark Macapagal was signed in from free agency. In the middle of the conference, big man Enrico Villanueva, who only played one game for Batang Pier, was acquired by Air21 in exchange for Ronnie Matias and Carlo Sharma. After losing their first 8 games, the Batang Pier won their last assignment against Barako Bull to give Jarencio his first win in the PBA. The team finished last in this conference.

Governors' Cup
Before the Commissioner's Cup officially ended, GlobalPort pushed through their bid to acquire Taha from San Miguel Beer in exchange of rookie big man, Justin Chua. After playing for a few games for the Batang Pier, Taha was then shipped to San Mig Super Coffee camp along with Ronnie Matias for center Yancy De Ocampo and sniper Val Acuña. In a separate deal, GlobalPort traded Nico Salva and Bonbon Custodio to the Barako Bull Energy to acquire Ronjay Buenafe plus a future second-round pick of the Energy. Rudy Lingganay was also reacquired after being released prior to the start of the previous conference. A repeat performance for the Batang Pier as they ended the season-ending conference with another 1–8 win–loss record.

2014–2015 Season: The rise of Terrence Romeo and the arrival of Stanley Pringle

Philippine Cup
With new season, new team logo, and a lot of fresh faces, GlobalPort continues to build its lineup. During the offseason, several trades were approved by the PBA. The team started by a one on one trade between incoming sophomore point guard RR Garcia for the services of Barako Bull forward Keith Jensen. It was followed by the departure of ex-team captain Menk to join Alaska Milk in exchange for two second round picks. Jondan Salvador was then shipped back to Barako Bull for sweet-shooting forward Mark Isip. And after being in and out of the trade bloc, GlobalPort management decided to trade Gilas forward Washington to Talk 'N Text for Nonoy Baclao and the Tropang Texters’ 2017 first round pick. The team also had a big rookie harvest from the 2014 PBA draft selecting Stanley Pringle as the first overall pick, Anthony Semerad (7th), Prince Caperal (17th) and John Pinto (19th). Jojo Duncil was then picked up by the Batang Pier, after being released by Barako Bull and signed the undrafted rookie Roider Cabrera, including the unsigned Kia Sorento pick, Paolo Taha.

Jarencio steered the team to a 4–4 start, including a huge upset victory against Talk 'N Text, which was also the franchise' first win against the Texters since joining the league in 2012. The average margin of their losses was only 4.25 points, until they were hammered by San Miguel with a 95–69 defeat, resulting to a sudden change within their coaching staff. Assistant coach Eric Gonzales was appointed as interim head coach, while Jarencio was named as the team's consultant. In this instance, the coaching change produced instant results for GlobalPort. The team gave Barangay Ginebra a tough beating with a 21-point victory. Gonzales became only man to claim a first game win as head coach of the Batang Pier, aside from helming the franchise to its biggest win since joining the league prior to the 2012–13 season. The team then lost its chance for a twice-to-beat edge to Meralco on their final elimination game. They placed 8th with a 5–6 record. Before the start of the quarterfinals, Cabagnot was traded back to San Miguel in exchange for Mercado and the second round picks of 2018 and 2019. The team ended the campaign with the loss to Barangay Ginebra in the play-offs. Before the tourney was over, Mercado was traded away after playing one game for the Batang Pier to Barako Bull in exchange for Denok Miranda and a 2016 second-rounder.

Commissioner's Cup
GlobalPort debuted with C. J. Leslie as their import and won the opening game of the Commissioner's Cup. Leslie's numbers were impressive and he led the Batang Pier to a 2–2 record, but a lack of inside threat was the main reason why he was replaced by Calvin Warner. On their game against Blackwater, Warner posted a new franchise record 30 rebounds, while the team notched a new franchise best mark of 74 total rebounds. It was the team's first back-to-back wins under Coach Gonzales as they also registered their biggest win margin at 23 points. However, a personal reason caused Warner to leave the country, so the team opted to switch import once more to Derrick Caracter. They also traded Nonoy Baclao to Alaska, and received Gabby Espinas in return, while exchanging the teams' 2017 first rounders. Unfortunately, the team lost all of its remaining games with Caracter as their import and failed to clinched a quarterfinal slot. Before the conference ended, GlobalPort parted ways with Espinas and Yancy De Ocampo, and welcomed Billy Mamaril and Doug Kramer in a 4-team trade.

Governors' Cup
Milestone after milestone, all PBA teams are given the option to have an Asian import this conference aside from the regular imports and the team signed in Omar Krayem. The team also got the chance to have an import with unlimited height after being ranked at the bottom four of the standings after the first two conferences and they signed in their first 7-footer import in Patrick O'Bryant. He was replaced by Steve Thomas after two games. The team had their best start ever at 3–0 after, including their first ever franchise win against Star since joining the league. They parted ways with Kelly Nabong in a three-team trade that sent him to the Bolts while receiving a second-rounder from NLEX. The Batang Pier also went on their first out of the country game in Dubai parading their first import choice in Jarrid Famous, but they lost to the Elasto Painters in a game where Romeo scored his career-high 40 points, which is, according to Fidel Mangonon III, the franchise record for most points scored in a game, which is also equals to the production of Markeith Cummings in 2013. Romeo also became the 13th among active players who've scored 40+ in a PBA game according to Mangonon. The team recorded its highest scoring output in a 123–120 win against the Tropang Texters, and its biggest winning margin by far at 28 points against NLEX while Famous notched a team record of 37 rebounds in a single game (3rd highest all time in the PBA). The team also registered their most wins in a conference with 7 wins. They ended the eliminations with a 7–4 record, good enough for their best-ever finish at 4th seed, which was rewarded with a twice-to-beat advantage against fifth seeded Star. However, the Hotshots managed to overcome their twice-to-win disadvantage, including the most lopsided win in playoffs history of the PBA with a 126–73 beating of the Batang Pier.

2015–2016 season

Philippine Cup
The Batang Pier squad is determined to top their fifth-place finish from the previous season and reach the semifinals for the first time. The team had a busy off-season which started with the acquisition of Joseph Yeo from Barako Bull in exchange for the 2016 first round pick and the 2018 2nd round pick (whichever is lower). The team then traded Jewel Ponferada and their 2015 second round pick for the services of Jervy Cruz, who was sent to Barako Bull for Rico Maierhofer. A one-on-one deal also took place as the Batang Pier sent Miranda for the return of Washington to the team. Many were also surprised to see Roi Sumang fell on the third round of the PBA Draft who was gladly selected by GlobalPort, having no first and second round picks. The team also signed free agents Jonathan Uyloan and Philip Paniamogan, who was undrafted from the 2014 PBA Draft. Finally, Prince Caperal became part of a four team trade that saw Dorian Peña land at GlobalPort.

The Batang Pier triumphed against Barako Bull with a twice-to-beat advantage in the first phase of the quarterfinals. They outlasted Barangay Ginebra in a controversial knockout match in the second phase. The team entered the semifinals to face top seeded Alaska in a best of 7 series. After winning Game One behind Romeo's 41 points, GlobalPort lost four straight games to bow out of the tournament. It was the best finish of the franchise for the last four years.

On the brighter side, the tandem of Romeo and Pringle was recognized by the PBA as the "Slash Brothers".

Commissioner's Cup
The team failed to pick-up where they left-off in the Philippine Cup as the Slash Brothers were hampered with injuries in the majority of the conference. To fill the guard rotation, the Batang Pier acquired Jeric Fortuna from Phoenix Fuel Masters by sending the team's 2018 second round pick. Imports Brian Williams and Calvin Warner failed to deliver for the team's first few games as they were eventually replaced by Shawn Taggart by the end of the conference. However, the team still finished dead last with a 3–8 standing.

Governors' Cup
Player movement was expected as Keith Jensen, Paola Taha, Jonathan Uyloan and Roi Sumang were involved in a three-team trade. In return, GlobalPort acquired Karl Dehesa, Ronald Pascual and Yousef Taha, who's on his third duty as a Batang Pier. The team also signed free agents Sunday Salvacion, Gab Banal and Papot Paredes. They also paraded Dominique Sutton as their import but was later replaced by Mike Glover as GlobalPort let Sutton pursue his NBA Dream. Ronald Pascual was also traded to Blackwater for Mike Cortez. The team did not find their groove in the Governors' Cup and they finished 10th with a 4–7 card.

2016–2017 season

Philippine Cup
GlobalPort announced Franz Pumaren to be the head coach for this season. Key players were added in the roster: KG Canaleta was signed from free agency; the team acquired J. R. Quinahan for Jay Washington, Mick Pennisi for Doug Kramer, and Aaron Aban for GP's 2019 second round pick; Von Pessumal was tapped from the Gilas Special Draft and Jessie Saitanan was given contract after being unsigned by Meralco from the regular draft. During the season, Josh Urbiztondo and Yutien Andrada was also picked up, however, the team relegated Karl Dehesa to become an unrestricted free agent.

Terrence Romeo once again led the league in scoring and was also one of the assist leaders during the conference. The team clinched the 5th seed and faced TNT KaKropa in the quarterfinals. TNT swept GlobalPort in their series. Coach Pumaren emphasized how shallow the bench of GlobalPort was and stated that in order to move forward, player changes are needed.

Commissioner's Cup
The team's roster was intact as the conference started. The team's losses continue to pile up due to Terrence Romeo's health woes and some import changes from Sean Williams to Malcolm White. kg Canaleta was dealt to Blackwater for Dylan Ababou and James Forrester. The team seemed to miss the playoffs until GlobalPort made some moves near the end of the eliminations. JR Quinahan and Anthony Semerad were traded together with a 2017 1st rounder to get Sean Anthony and Gilas cadets, Jonathan Grey and Bradwyn Guinto. Justin Harper also replaced White and the fortunes of the Batang Pier turned around. They managed to reach the playoffs after ousting Alaska in a knockoff game for 8th seed. However, the team bowed to the 1st seeded Ginebra in a heated battle which saw the ejection of Terrence Romeo after an altercation with LA Tenorio.

Governors' Cup
GlobalPort traded Von Pessumal for fellow cadet Arnold Van Opstal. The team also signed Ryan Araña, Mark Cardona, Paulo Hubalde and Robby Celiz from the free agent pool. Dylan Ababou was also shipped for Mac Baracael. Jabril Trawick was the team's import for the first game but was replaced by Murphy Holloway throughout the conference. The Batang Pier showed promise as they split their first 6 assignments before losing 5 straight games to end their campaign, mainly due to the absence of Romeo or Pringle for different reasons. They finished 10th in the standings after the elimination round.

2017–2018 season

Philippine Cup
During the off-season, the team drafted Fil-Am Robert Herndon, Andreas Cahilig, former Arellano Chief Zach Nicholls and Gian Abrigo. The draft rights of Herndon and Abrigo were then traded to the Magnolia Hotshots in exchange for the rights of co-rookies Julian Sargent, Lervin Flores and Joseph Gabayni. They also brought back Pido Jarencio as head coach. They played most of the conference without Romeo who was injured from the previous conference and only compiled a 5–6 win – loss record for the 7th seed and a quarterfinal match-up against the 2nd seeded Hotshots who have a twice-to-win advantage. Despite having the lead at halftime with a score of 45–34 and a decent 14 point, 5 rebound, 6 assist performance for the returning Romeo, they lost to the Hotshots 86–79.

Governors' Cup
The GlobalPort Batang Pier announced on August 10, 2018 that they will compete as the NorthPort Batang Pier for the 2018 PBA Governors' Cup.

Current roster

Season-by-season records

Records from the 2022–23 PBA season:
*one-game playoffs**team had the twice-to-beat advantage

Head coaches

Player of Note

Other Notable Players

 Dylan Ababou
 Aaron Aban
 Val Acuña
 Rommel Adducul
 Japeth Aguilar
 Rabeh Al-Hussaini
 Yousif Aljamal
 Chad Alonzo
 Yutien Andrada
 Sean Anthony
 William Antonio
 Nonoy Baclao
 Gabriel Banal
 Mac Baracael
 Jaypee Belencion
 Ronjay Buenafe
 Alex Cabagnot
 Roider Cabrera
 KG Canaleta
 Prince Caperal
 Mark Cardona
 JVee Casio
 Justin Chua
 Alex Crisano
 Mike Cortez
 Jervy Cruz
 Marvin Cruz
 Bonbon Custodio
 Jopher Custodio
 Gary David
 Yancy De Ocampo
 Karl Dehesa
 Jason Deutchman
 Jojo Duncil
 Gabby Espinas
 Bryan Faundo
 Jeric Fortuna
 RR Garcia
 Rey Guevarra
 Isaac Holstein
 Mark Isip
 Rudy Lingganay
 Keith Jensen
 Doug Kramer
 Mark Macapagal
 Rico Maierhofer
 AJ Mandani
 Vic Manuel
 Ronnie Matias
 Sol Mercado
 Eric Menk
 Willie Miller
 Denok Miranda
 Kelly Nabong
 Leo Najorda
 Philip Paniamogan
 Philip Paredes
 Ronald Pascual
 Dorian Peña
 Mick Pennisi
 John Pinto
 Jewel Ponferada
 Von Pessumal
 J.R. Quiñahan
 Angelus Raymundo
 LA Revilla
 Terrence Romeo
 Jessie Saitanan
 Nico Salva
 Jondan Salvador
 Carlo Sharma
 Anthony Semerad
 Roi Sumang
 Paolo Taha
 Yousef Taha
 Josh Urbiztondo
 Jonathan Uyloan
 Josh Vanlandingham
 Arnold Van Opstal
 Al Vergara
 Enrico Villanueva
 Jay Washington
 Mark Yee
 Joseph Yeo

Imports

 Justin Williams (2013 PBA Commissioner's Cup)
 Walter Sharpe (2013 PBA Commissioner's Cup)
 Sylvester Morgan (2013 PBA Commissioner's Cup)
 Markeith Cummings (2013 PBA Governor's Cup)
 Evan Brock (2014 PBA Commissioner's Cup)
 LeRoy Hickerson (2014 PBA Governors' Cup)
 Dior Lowhorn (2014 PBA Governors' Cup)
 C. J. Leslie (2015 PBA Commissioner's Cup)
 Calvin Warner (2015 PBA Commissioner's Cup)
 Derrick Caracter (2015 PBA Commissioner's Cup)
 Patrick O'Bryant (2015 PBA Governors' Cup)
 Omar Krayem (2015 PBA Governors' Cup)
 Steven Thomas (2015 PBA Governors' Cup)
 Jarrid Famous (2015 PBA Governors' Cup)
 Brian Williams (2016 PBA Commissioner's Cup)
 Calvin Warner (2016 PBA Commissioner's Cup)
 Shawn Taggart (2016 PBA Commissioner's Cup)
 Dominique Sutton (2016 PBA Governors' Cup)
 Mike Glover (2016 PBA Governors' Cup)
 Sean Williams (2017 PBA Commissioner's Cup)
 Malcolm White (2017 PBA Commissioner's Cup)
 Justin Harper (2017 PBA Commissioner's Cup)
 Jabril Trawick (2017 PBA Governors' Cup)
 Murphy Holloway (2017 PBA Governors' Cup)
 Malcolm White (2018 PBA Commissioner's Cup)
 Rashad Woods (2018 PBA Governors' Cup)

See also
NorthPort Batang Pier draft history

References

External links

 
2012 establishments in the Philippines
Basketball teams established in 2012